The Siamou language, also known as Seme (Sɛmɛ), is a language spoken mainly in Burkina Faso. It is part of the Kru languages or unclassified within the proposed Niger–Congo languages. It is also spoken in Ivory Coast and Mali, and could likely be a language isolate.

The speakers call themselves Seme. The Dioula language exonym is Siamou.

Classification
Siamou is traditionally classed as Kru. However, according to Roger Blench (2013) and Pierre Vogler (2015), the language bears little resemblance to Kru. Güldemann (2018) also leaves out Siamou as unrelated to Niger-Congo and considers it a language isolate. Glottolog considers it a language isolate.

Siamou word order is SOV, like the Senufo languages, but unlike the SVO Central Gur languages.

Geographical distribution
In 1999, it was spoken by 20,000 people in western Burkina Faso and another 20,000 in the Ivory Coast and Mali. In Burkina Faso, it is mainly spoken in the province of Kénédougou, around the provincial capital Orodara and the surrounding villages of Bandougou, Didéri, Diéri, Diéridéni, Diossogou, Kotoudéni, Lidara, and Tin. Siamou has one major dialect, Bandougou. In addition, there are minor dialectal differences among the Siamou spoken in Orodara and in surrounding villages. It is also spoken in Toussiana Department of Burkina Faso.

See also 
 Languages of Africa

Further reading 
Prost, André. 1964. Contribution à l’étude des langues voltaiques. Dakar: IFAN.
Traoré, Kotalama. 1984. Eléments de phonologie dimensionnelle du Seme. Ouagadougou: Université de Ouagadougou MA thesis.
Traoré, Kotalama. 1985. Recherche sur la structure de l’enonce Seme. Nice: Université de Nice MA thesis.
Traoré, Kalifa & Nadine Bednarz. 2008. Mathématiques construites en contexte: une analyse du système de numération oral utilisé par les Siamous au Burkina Faso. Nordic Journal of African Studies 17(3). 175–197.
Toews, Carmela I. P. 2010. Siamou future expressions. In Melinda Heijl (ed.), Proceedings of the Annual Conference of the Canadian Linguistics Association 2010, 1‒12. Montréal: Concordia University.
Toews, Carmela I. P. 2015. Topics in Siamou tense and aspect. Vancouver: University of British Columbia dissertation.

Notes

References 
 Blench, Roger (2013) "Why Is Africa So Linguistically Undiverse? Exploring Substrates and Isolates." in Mother Tongue, Issue XVIII, pp. 43–78. Journal of the Association for the Study of Language in Prehistory.

Kru languages
Languages of Burkina Faso
Language isolates of Africa